Wendelin Werner (born 23 September 1968) is a German-born French mathematician working on random processes such as self-avoiding random walks, Brownian motion, Schramm–Loewner evolution, and related theories in probability theory and mathematical physics.  In 2006, at the 25th International Congress of Mathematicians in Madrid, Spain he received the Fields Medal "for his contributions to the development of stochastic Loewner evolution, the geometry of two-dimensional Brownian motion, and conformal field theory".  He is a professor at ETH Zürich until May 2023, after which he will take up a professorship at the University of Cambridge.

Biography
Werner was born on 23 September 1968 in Cologne, West Germany. His parents moved to France when he was nine months old and he became a French citizen in 1977. After a classe préparatoire at Lycée Hoche in Versailles, he studied at École Normale Supérieure  from 1987 to 1991. His 1993 doctorate was written at the Université Pierre-et-Marie-Curie and supervised by Jean-François Le Gall.  Werner was a researcher at the CNRS (National Center of Scientific Research, Centre national de la recherche scientifique) from 1991 to 1997, during which he also held a two-year Leibniz Fellowship, at the University of Cambridge. He was Professor at
the University of Paris-Sud from 1997 to 2013 and also taught at the École Normale Supérieure from 2005 to 2013.

Awards and honors
Werner has received several awards, including the Rollo Davidson Prize in 1998, the Prix Paul Doistau–Émile Blutet in 1999, the Fermat Prize in 2001, the Grand Prix Jacques Herbrand of the French Academy of Sciences in 2003, the Loève Prize in 2005, the 2006 SIAM George Pólya Prize with his collaborators Gregory Lawler and Oded Schramm, the Fields medal in 2006, and the Heinz Gumin Prize (de) in 2016.

He became a member of the French Academy of Sciences in 2008.  He is also a member of other academies of sciences, including the Academy of Sciences Leopoldina and the Berlin-Brandenburg Academy of Sciences and is an honorary fellow of Gonville and Caius College.  He was elected a Foreign Member of the Royal Society in 2020.

Miscellaneous
He also had a part in the 1982 French film La Passante du Sans-Souci. He has an
Erdős–Bacon number of six.

References

External links
 
 
 Page at ETH
 La Passante du Sans-Souci on imdb.org
 

1968 births
Living people
20th-century French mathematicians
21st-century French mathematicians
École Normale Supérieure alumni
Academic staff of ETH Zurich
Fields Medalists
French National Centre for Scientific Research scientists
German emigrants to France
Naturalized citizens of France
Lycée Hoche alumni
Members of the French Academy of Sciences
Probability theorists
Prix Paul Doistau–Émile Blutet laureates
Paris-Saclay University people
Paris-Saclay University alumni
Foreign Members of the Royal Society